Gungsangnorbu (1871–1930) was an Inner Mongolian prince and politician of the Republic of China. Some scholars describe him as a moderate, progressive moderniser caught between the influence of conservative older leaders and young radicals. Others describe him less favourably as a conservative who, despite his early activities for promoting education, would go on to become protective of his own rights and interest as a member of the nobility, and suspicious of young Mongols who had received a modern education as potential challengers to those interests.

Names
In the (proleptic) Mongolian Cyrillic alphabet, it is written Гүнсэнноров (Günsennorov).

Career
Gungsangnorbu was prince of Right Harqin Banner (today part of Chifeng). He was born and spent his childhood in his ancestral home, the Ka La Qin Palace. In 1902, he established what has been described as one of the first modern schools in Inner Mongolia. In 1903, he was invited to visit Japan along with a group of Manchu nobles, where he was highly impressed with the Meiji period reforms; upon his return to Inner Mongolia established a military school and a girls' school, both with Japanese teachers. Among his pupils there was Serengdongrub. Later, he sent a small number of Mongolian students to Japan, including Altanochir.

When the Xinhai Revolution broke out in 1911, Gungsangnorbu probably joined the Royalist Party and advocated the independence of Mongolia from China. As Outer Mongolia managed to gain independence with Russian support, Gungsangnorbu turned to the Japanese. He and other Inner Mongolian princes took loans and received arms from the Japanese to prepare their secession from China. The Imperial Japanese Army even dispatched a major and two captains in December 1911 to act as liaison officers for Gungsangnorbu. In the aftermath of the Xinhai Revolution, Gungsangnorbu made some attempts to form an alliance with Bogd Khan and the Khalkha Mongols in the newly independent state of Mongolia, with the Pan-Mongolist aim of annexing China's Inner Mongolian territories to an independent, Mongol-dominated Greater Mongolia. However, political fragmentation and the reality of a large Han Chinese population in his own domains thwarted this idea. He restricted himself to a more modest effort to attempt to consolidate his own power and unite the Inner Mongolian nobility. He began purchasing weapons from a group of Japanese army officers in Beijing connected to Kawashima Naniwa; however, the arms shipments were intercepted and the officers involved arrested, bringing to an end Gungsangnorbu's efforts to strengthen his own military power. Instead, he participated in Yuan Shikai's Beiyang Government, taking a position as director of the Mongolian and Tibetan Affairs Commission, and overseeing the establishment of the Mongolian and Tibetan Academy in Beijing, which trained a number of cadres who would go on to achieve prominence in Inner Mongolian politics in the coming decades. He was the only Mongol prince to achieve ministerial rank in Yuan's government. He would hold that position for seventeen years, though in the chaos of the warlord era he was not able to achieve all that he hoped for. After the 1928 Northern Expedition he resigned from his position, and died two years later.

Notes

Citations

Bibliography

Further reading

1871 births
1930 deaths
People from Chifeng
Republic of China politicians from Inner Mongolia